Group B was one of two groups of the 2019 IIHF World Championship. The four best placed teams advanced to the playoff round, while the last placed team was relegated to Division I in 2020.

Standings

Matches
All times are local (UTC+2).

Russia vs Norway

Czech Republic vs Sweden

Switzerland vs Italy

Latvia vs Austria

Norway vs Czech Republic

Russia vs Austria

Italy vs Sweden

Latvia vs Switzerland

Russia vs Czech Republic

Norway vs Sweden

Italy vs Latvia

Switzerland vs Austria

Switzerland vs Norway

Russia vs Italy

Sweden vs Austria

Czech Republic vs Latvia

Austria vs Norway

Czech Republic vs Italy

Latvia vs Russia

Italy vs Norway

Sweden vs Switzerland

Austria vs Czech Republic

Switzerland vs Russia

Sweden vs Latvia

Austria vs Italy

Czech Republic vs Switzerland

Norway vs Latvia

Sweden vs Russia

References

External links
Official website

B